Kang Jin-pil (Hangul: 강진필), better known by the stage name P-Type (Hangul: 피타입), is a South Korean rapper. He began his career as an underground rapper in the 1990s and released his debut studio album, Heavy Bass, in 2004. He gained mainstream attention after appearing on the reality TV shows Show Me the Money 4 and Show Me the Money 6, in 2015 and 2017, respectively.

Discography

Studio albums

Singles

Filmography

Television

References 

South Korean male rappers
Show Me the Money (South Korean TV series) contestants
Brand New Music artists